Pierre Aubry (born April 15, 1960) is a Canadian former professional ice hockey left winger who played five seasons in the National Hockey League for the Quebec Nordiques and Detroit Red Wings from 1980–81 to 1984–85.

Aubry played 202 career NHL games, scoring twenty four goals and twenty-six assists for fifty points. He also played twenty career playoff games, scoring one goal and one assist.

Family 
Aubry's son, Louis-Marc (born 1991), was selected by the Detroit Red Wings in the third round of the 2010 NHL Entry Draft. Louis-Marc is played in the Deutsche Eishockey Liga.

Career statistics

Regular season and playoffs

References

External links
 

1960 births
Living people
Adirondack Red Wings players
Canadian ice hockey left wingers
Chamonix HC players
Detroit Red Wings players
Diables Noirs de Tours players
French Quebecers
Fredericton Express players
Genève-Servette HC players
Ice hockey people from Quebec
Ligue Nord-Américaine de Hockey players
Quebec Nordiques players
Quebec Remparts players
Rochester Americans players
SHC Fassa players
Sportspeople from Trois-Rivières
Trois-Rivières Draveurs players
Undrafted National Hockey League players